"Shine, Shine, Shine" is a song written by Ken Bell and Bud McGuire, and originally recorded by Razzy Bailey on his 1985 album Arrival.  American country music artist Eddy Raven released the song in August 1987 as the fourth single from his album Right Hand Man.  The song was Raven's second number one country single, his first since "I Got Mexico" three years before.  The single went to number one for one week and spent a total of thirteen weeks on the country chart.  It was also recorded by country artist Razzy Bailey on his 1985 album Arrival.

Charts

Weekly charts

Year-end charts

References

1987 singles
1985 songs
Razzy Bailey songs
Eddy Raven songs
RCA Records singles
Songs written by Ken Bell (songwriter)